Gordon Landy (13 January 1900 – 4 January 1970) was an Australian rules footballer who played with Melbourne in the Victorian Football League (VFL).

Notes

External links 
		
 

1900 births
1970 deaths
Australian rules footballers from Victoria (Australia)
Melbourne Football Club players